Three Houses can refer to

 Three Houses, Barbados
 Fire Emblem: Three Houses, a 2019 video game